Václav Činčala (born 23 April 1974) is a retired Czech football striker.

References

1974 births
Living people
Czech footballers
FC Baník Ostrava players
MFK Karviná players
VFC Plauen players
Bohemians 1905 players
1. FC Slovácko players
FC Fastav Zlín players
Association football forwards
Czech First League players
Czech expatriate footballers
Expatriate footballers in Germany
Czech expatriate sportspeople in Germany
Sportspeople from Ostrava